Chuguyevka is a rural locality (a selo) and the administrative center of Chuguyevsky District, Primorsky Krai, Russia. 

Population:

References

Notes

Sources

Rural localities in Primorsky Krai